{{DISPLAYTITLE:C14H18FNO2}}
The molecular formula C14H18FNO2 (molar mass: 251.297 g/mol, exact mass: 251.1322 u) may refer to:

 4-Fluoromethylphenidate
 Lubazodone

Molecular formulas